Bonnes is a commune in the Charente department in southwestern France, close to the border with the Dordogne department.  It is located about 50km west of Périgueux on the river Dronne.

Population

See also
Communes of the Charente department

References

External links

 Official Website from the village

Communes of Charente